Gin is an alcoholic beverage flavoured with juniper berries.

Gin or Gins may also refer to:

People
 Gin (name)
 Gin people, China

Places
 Gin, Mississippi
 Gin Branch, a river in Tennessee
 Gin River, a river in Sri Lanka
 Ginza stop, a Light Rail stop in Hong Kong
 GIN, ISO-3166-1 alpha-3 code of Guinea

Art, entertainment, and media
 Gin (Border Collie), on TV series Britain's Got Talent
 Gin rummy, a card game
 Gin (album), by Cobalt, 2009

Other uses
 Cotton gin, a machine to separate cotton fibers and seedpods
 Gin Gliders, a South Korean manufacturer
 GINS (protein complex) in DNA replication
 An assembler for GEORGE (operating system)
 Horse gin

See also
 Gin trap, a spring-loaded trap for catching small animals, such as rabbits.
 Gin gang, horse mill structure
 Gin Gin (disambiguation)
 Gines (disambiguation)

 Djin
 Gene (disambiguation)
 Jin (disambiguation)